William Gwin (6 December 1832 – 3 January 1863) was an officer in the United States Navy who was killed in action during the American Civil War. One of the most promising officers in the nation, with extensive command and combat experience, Gwin had risen to the rank of lieutenant commander by the time of his death.

Early life and career
Born in Columbus, Indiana, Gwin was appointed a midshipman on 7 April 1847. Gwin subsequently served in the frigate  on the Brazil Squadron until late in 1850. During the next five years he was assigned to the sloop of war , flagship of the African Squadron, the steamer  and the brig . In September 1855, while serving in the latter, he was promoted to the rank of Lieutenant. From late 1857 until after the outbreak of the American Civil War in the spring of 1861, Gwin was an officer of the steamer  and sloop of war , both in the Pacific, and of the steam frigate  in the Mediterranean.

Civil War
Returning to the United States in mid-1861, Lieutenant Gwin began Civil War combat service in the newly acquired cruiser  and, later in the year, was assigned to the brig .

He commanded several ships of the Mississippi Squadron and was one of Flag Officer Andrew Hull Foote's "can do" officers, displaying outstanding initiative, energy and dash. After the fall of Fort Henry he swept with his wooden gunboats up the Tennessee River all the way to regions of Alabama. This action was a major factor in the collapse of the Confederate lines far behind him in Kentucky. He was wounded in action 27 December 1862, while commanding the gunboat  in the Battle of Haines Bluff on the Yazoo River.

He died from these injuries on 3 January 1863, on board a hospital ship in the Mississippi River. In reporting his death to the Navy Department, Gwin's squadron commander, Rear Admiral David Dixon Porter, remarked: "The country has lost one of its bravest officers."

Namesakes
Four ships have been named  for him.

See also

References
Notes

Bibliography
 
 

1832 births
1863 deaths
Union Navy officers
People from Columbus, Indiana
United States Navy officers
People of Indiana in the American Civil War
Union military personnel killed in the American Civil War